Manakula Vinayagar Institute of Technology (French: Institut de technologie de Manakula Vinayagar) is a college in Kalitheerthalkuppam, Puducherry, India. The college offers two-year, four-year, and post-graduate degrees. The self-financing technical institute has started in 2008 by Sri Manakula Vinayagar Educational Trust.

Courses

 B.Tech – Electrical & Electronics Engineering (EEE)
 B.Tech – Computer Science & Engineering (CSE)
 B.Tech – Electrical & Electronics Engineering (EEE)
 B.Tech – Electronics & Communication Engineering (ECE)
 B.Tech – Computer Science & Engineering (CSE)
 B.Tech – Information Technology (IT)
 B.Tech – Mechanical Engineering (MECH)
 B.Tech –Robotics and Automation
 B.Tech – Food Technology
 M.Tech Electronics & Communication Engineering
 M.Tech Computer Science & Engineering
 Master of Business Administration (MBA)

References

External links
 

Engineering colleges in Puducherry
Colleges affiliated to Pondicherry University